"I zoi mou oli" (Greek: Η ζωή μου όλη) is a well known song of Stelios Kazantzidis. The lyrics are written by Akis Panou (Greek: Άκης Πάνου) who is also the composer of the song. The title "I zoi mou oli" can be translated in English as "My entire life".

Stelios Kazantzidis interviewed by Giorgos Lianis stated that even if it was difficult to make a choice between his songs considered "I zoi mou oli" as one of his finest songs.

Lyrics 

 My entire life is a responsibility
 it takes everything from me, it gives [me] nothing
 my entire life is a furnace
 in which I have fallen and cooks me slowly

 My entire life, a foolery
 my only property
 my entire life is a self-sacrifice
 which has neither meaning nor purpose

 My entire life is a cigarette
 which I don't appreciate, yet I smoke
 and when it becomes a dogend, I'll offer it to Death
 when the time comes for me to meet him
 — Singer: Stelios Kazantzidis, Songwriter: Akis Panou, Composer: Akis Panou

External links
Stelios Kazantzids performs I zoi mou oli live

Stelios Kazantzidis songs
Greek songs
Year of song missing